The Chicago subway refers primarily to the Chicago Transit Authority. It may also refer to:
 Underground lines of the Chicago "L", operated by the Chicago Transit Authority
 Milwaukee–Dearborn subway
 State Street subway
 Chicago Pedway, a tunnel network

See also
 Chicago Transit Authority (disambiguation)